Dohren is a municipality in the district of Harburg, in Lower Saxony, Germany.

Dohren is home to a Baseball Bundesliga team, the Dohren Wild Farmers.  The team was promoted to the Bundesliga after the 2009 season.

References

Harburg (district)